Shower is a surname. Notable people with the name include:

 Bartholomew Shower (1658–1701), English lawyer and politician
 Jacob Shower (1803–1879), American politician
 John Shower (1657–1715), English nonconformist minister
 Kathy Shower (born 1953), American actress and nude model

See also
 Showers (surname)